Stadio Olimpico Carlo Zecchini (formerly known as Stadio Olimpico Comunale) is a multi-use stadium in Grosseto, Italy.  It is currently used mostly for football matches and is the home ground of U.S. Grosseto.  The stadium holds 10,200.

During the 1960 Summer Olympics in Rome, the stadium hosted several football preliminaries. It has also hosted home matches of U.S. Gavorrano and U.S. Pianese.

References

1960 Summer Olympics official report. Volume 1. p. 86.

F.C. Grosseto S.S.D.
Venues of the 1960 Summer Olympics
Olympic football venues
Carlo Zecchini
Buildings and structures in Grosseto
Sports venues in Tuscany
Sport in Grosseto